Jones Buttress is a wedge-shaped feature similar to and  north of Brown Buttress, where it juts out from the east side of Surveyors Range into Dickey Glacier. It was named in honor of L. R. Jones, a member of the 1959 Cape Hallett winter-over team, working as a scientific officer on the geomagnetic project.

References

Rock formations of the Ross Dependency
Shackleton Coast